E 44 is one of the main roads of the United Arab Emirates (UAE).  The road connects the city of Dubai to the town of Hatta. In Dubai, the city is also referred to as Al Khail Road, Ras al Khor Road and, Al Aweer Road, Dubai-Hatta Highway.  E 44 also connects the UAE with Oman.

E 44 originates (as Al Khail Road) in Al Barsha, Dubai and runs roughly parallel to E 11 (Sheikh Zayed Road) and E 311 (Emirates Road).  It is referred to as Ras Al Khor Road after the E 44-Oud Mehta Road junction near Dubai Creek. The section between Sheikh Mohammed Bin Zayed Road and Emirates Road is known as Al Awir Road. E 44 terminates in the town of Hatta.

See also 
 Dubai Safari Park

References 

Roads in the United Arab Emirates
Transport in Dubai